United States v. Enmons, 410 U.S. 396 (1973), was a United States Supreme Court case in which the Court held that the federal Anti-Racketeering Act of 1934, known as the Hobbs Act,  does not cover union violence in furtherance of the union's objectives.

The case involved a labor strike in which members of the International Brotherhood of Electrical Workers (IBEW) fired rifles at three utility company transformers, drained the oil from another, and blew up a company substation. The labor union in question was seeking a higher-pay contract and other benefits from their employer, the Gulf States Utilities Company which is now part of Entergy. The federal government tried the defendants under the Hobbs Act.

The Court ruled that "The Hobbs Act, which makes it a federal crime to obstruct interstate commerce by robbery or extortion, does not reach the use of violence (which is readily punishable under state law) to achieve legitimate union objectives, such as higher wages in return for genuine services that the employer seeks."

Details of the case
The indictment against the alleged conspirators charged them with being in violation of the Hobbs Act, which states that anyone attempting to affect or obstruct commerce through violence or the threat of violence against any person or property "shall be fined not more than $10,000 or imprisoned not more than twenty years, or both." The indictment argued that the union members obstructed commerce with their actions against the Utilities Company, and attempted to "obtain the property of [their employer] in the form of wages and other things of value" by using the wrongful use of force and the fear of economic loss.

The court acknowledged that using threats and force to obtain property is wrongful. However, the court reasoned that it is considered "wrongful" only when the perpetrator has no "legitimate claim" to it. Since federal law empowers unions with the right to strike, the use of violence to secure higher pay and benefits was not extortion. The case was dismissed. Such violent acts can, however, be punishable under normal state or federal laws.

In understanding Enmons, it is important to keep in mind that what the Hobbs Act outlaws is extortion, not just any bad act. Federal law, in particular the National Labor Relations Act, says that collective bargaining and strikes in support of collective bargaining goals are legal and protected. Therefore, since collective bargaining has a purpose that is not extortion, one of the key elements of a Hobbs Act violation is not met.

Reactions
Since 1973, a number of bills have been proposed by Republicans to overturn United States v. Enmons. The Freedom from Union Violence Act (FUVA) was first introduced by Rep. Phil Crane as H.R. 1796 on June 8, 1995, and was reintroduced three times; however, none of the bills made it out of committee.

Despite the Court indicating that union officials are subject to criminal law ("This type of violence...is subject to state criminal prosecution"), think tanks which oppose unions claim the Enmons decision grants union officials exemption from criminal prosecution for acts of violence. However, subsequent to the decision, cases have been successfully brought under the Hobbs Act against union officials who engaged in extortion.

On the extent of union violence, a 2001 law review article by law professor Julius Getman and former Secretary of Labor Ray Marshall, analyzing the evidence of union violence, indicated that:...the claim that strike violence is "escalating" has no empirical basis. Even the study conducted by the National Institute for Labor Relations Research - cited regularly as authority for this proposition by FUVA's proponents - draws no such conclusion. And the study itself is a scholarly monstrosity that seeks to study union violence by compiling media reports, mainly newspaper articles concerning strike violence. The Institute admits that it did not actually investigate any of the incidents reported and does not know if the reports are accurate. It concludes: "Because it relies on news accounts the Institute cannot guarantee the accuracy of the file itself." In fact, articles about employer-instigated violence are included in the study's effort to determine union violence.  It seems obvious that the methodology employed confuses those strikes most written about with those most violent. Further, the Institute includes incidents of "psychological violence; i.e., intimidation, coercion and verbal threats" - terms which it does not bother to define. It seems clear, however, that this definition would include nonviolent civil disobedience of the type used by the civil rights movement and increasingly by the labor movement. But whatever the definition, it is almost certain that strike-related violence has decreased since the Enmons decision because the number of strikes has declined significantly.

See also
 Entergy Corp. v. Riverkeeper Inc.
 Entergy Louisiana, Inc. v. Louisiana Public Service Commission

Footnotes

External links
 
 Small Business and Entrepreneurship Council: Union's Bad Name Moving toward cleanup

United States Supreme Court cases
1973 in United States case law
Labor-related violence in the United States
Union violence
Hobbs Act case law
International Brotherhood of Electrical Workers
United States labor case law
History of Beaumont, Texas
Entergy
United States Supreme Court cases of the Burger Court